Baron Lauri Almos Yrjö-Koskinen (2 March 1867 – 30 April 1936) was a Finnish landowner and politician, born in Helsinki. He was a Member of the Parliament of Finland from 1911 to 1913, representing the Finnish Party.

References

1867 births
1936 deaths
Politicians from Helsinki
People from Uusimaa Province (Grand Duchy of Finland)
20th-century Finnish nobility
Finnish Party politicians
Members of the Parliament of Finland (1911–13)
University of Helsinki alumni
19th-century Finnish nobility